Lingjing may refer to several places in the People's Republic of China:

Beijing
Lingjing Hutong (灵境), a hutong in Xidan district
Lingjing Hutong station (灵境), a subway station located near to the hutong

Guangxi province
Lingjing, Guangxi (岭景), located in Teng county

Henan province
Lingjing, Henan (灵井), located in Xuchang, central Henan